Liam Kelly (29 September 1922 – 7 June 2011) was an Irish republican, who was elected both to the House of Commons of Northern Ireland (1953–1958) (as an abstentionist) and as a member of the upper house of the Irish legislature Seanad Éireann (1954–1957) (which he did attend). He was also a member of the Irish Republican Army (IRA) and after his expulsion from that organisation in 1951, founded the Republican splinter group Saor Uladh and its political wing Fianna Uladh.

Expulsion from IRA and founding of Saor Uladh 

Kelly was a prominent member of the IRA from which he was expelled for insubordination in 1951, having carried out military activity with volunteers from east Tyrone without IRA Army Council approval. He then founded a splinter paramilitary group, Saor Uladh ("Free Ulster") whose activities were largely confined to Kelly's home area in east Tyrone. In November 1955 Kelly and a raiding party of Uladh members attacked the RUC station in Roslea, County Fermanagh. The raiders placed a mine by the guardroom window blowing it in, swept the ground floor with gunfire and moved into the barracks.  One police constable was seriously injured and one raider - Connie Green was killed. 

The Easter following the formation of Saor Uladh, members of the organisation took control of Kelly's home village of Pomeroy and held their own 1916 Rising commemoration; there were major confrontations between the Royal Ulster Constabulary (RUC), B-Specials and republicans. In 1953 he made a famous speech in neighbouring Carrickmore which subsequently led to his arrest by the RUC and conviction for sedition: "I will not give allegiance to the foreign queen of a bastard nation. I took an oath of allegiance to the Irish Republic when I was 16 and I intend to keep it...  Do I believe in force? The answer is yes. The more the better, the sooner the better. That may be treason or sedition, call it whatever the hell you like".

Saor Uladh focused their attacks exclusively on targets in Northern Ireland. Saor Uladh attacked six Northern Irish customs posts on November 11, 1956. Kelly disagreed with the idea of bombing cafes and bars frequented by British soldiers.

Prison sentence and election 

While in jail, Kelly was elected, on an Anti-Partition ticket, as an abstentionist candidate for the Stormont constituency of Mid Tyrone at the 1953 Northern Ireland general election. Upon being released from jail he returned to his hometown of Pomeroy, where a crowd of 10,000 had gathered to welcome him home.

Kelly held this seat until the following general election, though - as an abstentionist - he never attended Stormont.

Fianna Uladh 
Fianna Uladh was founded in 1953, as the political wing of Saor Uladh. Fianna Uladh's basic ideology - which placed it closer to Clann na Poblachta than to the Sinn Féin of that era - was summed up by Kelly in a speech made in Seanad Éireann in 1954:

We in Fianna Uladh recognise the Constitution of the Republic of Ireland under which this State operates and we are prepared to work within its framework to extend its operation to the whole of Ireland. Recognising only the Constitution and the sovereignty of the Irish people, we naturally reject the claim of Britain and of any of her institutions to exercise sovereignty in any portion of Ireland. We decline to prostitute our nationality and our consciences by taking the Oath of Allegiance to the British Crown as a condition of parliamentary representation. 44 Seanad Debates col 346 (25 November 1954).

The element of rejecting British sovereignty in Ireland which was left unstated on that occasion was Saor Uladh's and Kelly's own personal involvement in acts of violence in Northern Ireland. Fianna Uladh's foundation - and its policy of abstentionism - helped to precipitate the break-up of the Anti-Partition of Ireland League in March 1954.

Seanad election 
It was Kelly's association with Clann na Poblachta led to his nomination to the Seanad. In return for the Clann's support for the Second Inter-party Government (1954–1957), Taoiseach John A. Costello ensured that the votes of Fine Gael councillors elected Kelly to the Seanad (Labour Panel).

Kelly spoke as a Senator, in support of a motion that all elected parliamentary representatives of the people of "the six occupied counties of Ireland" should be given a right of audience in the Dáil or in the Seanad 

The IRA's Border Campaign (1956–1962) and Saor Uladh's attacks, contributed to the fall of the Government and the 1957 general election. Costello's Government, although it decided against the re-introduction of internment, responded to the activities of Saor Uladh and the mainstream IRA by stepping up security measures against these groups, leading to the arrest of prominent republicans. In response to this and to a deterioration in the state of the economy, Clann na Poblachta withdrew its support and Costello was left with no choice other than to call an election.

Emigration to the United States 
In 1959, Kelly moved to the United States, and by the 1970s he was the chair of the Republican Clubs organisation there.

His death notice described him as "a retired assistant Chief Superintendent of M.A.B.S.T.O.A."

Personal life 
Kelly was an uncle of the IRA volunteer Patrick Kelly, a member of the East Tyrone Brigade, who was shot dead by British forces at Loughgall in 1987.

Death 
Kelly died aged 88 in New York. Liam Kelly was buried in Pomeroy, County Tyrone.

References

Bibliography/further reading 
 J. Bowyer Bell, The Secret Army: The IRA
 Barry Flynn, Soldiers of Folly, Collins Press, 2009.

External links 
http://www.proni.gov.uk/records/private/cahir_h.htm The Cahir Healy Papers (Public Record Office of Northern Ireland) (Last visited, 20 July 2006.)
Maguire, John Internment, the IRA and the Lawless Case in Ireland: 1957-61 Journal of the Oxford University History Society, 2 (Michelmas 2004) pp 2–4. Available https://web.archive.org/web/20060928181954/http://users.ox.ac.uk/~jouhs/michaelmas2004/maguire02.pdf (Last visited, 14 July 2006)

1922 births
2011 deaths
Irish Republican Army (1922–1969) members
History of Northern Ireland
Members of the 8th Seanad
Members of the House of Commons of Northern Ireland 1953–1958
Independent members of Seanad Éireann
Members of the House of Commons of Northern Ireland for County Tyrone constituencies
Irish emigrants to the United States